The illustration of manuscript books was well established in ancient times, and the tradition of the illuminated manuscript thrived in the West until the invention of printing. Other parts of the world had comparable traditions, such as the Persian miniature.  Modern book illustration comes from the 15th-century woodcut illustrations that were fairly rapidly included in early printed books, and later block books. Other techniques such as engraving, etching, lithography and various kinds of colour printing were to expand the possibilities and were exploited by such masters as Daumier, Doré or Gavarni.

History

Book illustration as we now know it evolved from early European woodblock printing. In the early 15th century, playing cards were created using block printing, which was the first use of prints in a sequenced and logical order. "The first known European block printings with a communications function were devotional prints of saints." 

As printing took off and books became common, printers began to use woodcuts to illustrate them. Hence, "centers for woodblock playing-card and religious-print production became centers for illustrated books.  Printers of large early books often reused several times, and also had detachable "plugs" of figures, or the attributes of saints, which they could rearrange within a larger image to make several variations. Luxury books were for a few decades often printed with blank spaces for manual illumination in the old way.

Unlike later techniques, woodcut uses relief printing just as metal moveable type does, so that pages including both text and illustration can be set up and printed together. However the technique either gives rather crude results or was expensive if a high-quality block-cutter was used, and could only manage fine detail on atypically large pages.  It was not suitable for the level of detail required for maps, for example, and the 1477 Bolognese edition of Ptolemy's Cosmographia was both the first book to contain printed maps and the first to be illustrated by engravings (by Taddeo Crivelli) rather than woodcuts.  However hardly any further engraved illustrations were produced for several decades after about 1490, and instead a style of expensive books decorated in metalcut, mostly religious and produced in Paris, was a popular luxury product between about 1480 and 1540. In the middle of the 16th century woodcut was gradually overtaken by the intaglio printing techniques of engraving and etching which became dominant by about 1560-90, first in Antwerp, then Germany, Switzerland and Italy, the important publishing centres. They remained so until the later 19th century.  They required the illustrations to be printed separately, on a different type of printing press, so encouraging illustrations that took a whole page, which became the norm.

Engraving and etching gave sharper definition and finer detail to the illustrations, and rapidly became dominant by the late 15th century, often with the two techniques mixed together in a single plate.  A wide range of books were now illustrated, initially mostly on a few pages, but with the number of illustrations gradually rising over the period, and tending to use more etching than engraving.  Particular kinds of books such as scientific and technical works, children's books, and atlases now became very heavily illustrated, and from the mid-18th century many of the new form of the novel had a small number of illustrations.

Luxury books on geographical topics and natural history, and some children's books, had printed illustrations which were then coloured by hand, but in Europe none of the experimental techniques for true colour printing became widely used before the mid-19th century, when several different techniques became successful.  In East Asia colour printing with many different woodblocks was increasing widely used; the fully developed technique in Japan was called nishiki-e, and used in books as well as ukiyo-e prints.

Lithography (invented by Alois Senefelder in 1798 and made public in 1818) allowed for more textual variety and accuracy. This is because the artist could now draw directly on the printing plate itself.

New techniques developed in the nineteenth and twentieth centuries revolutionized book illustrations and put new resources at the disposal of artists and designers. In the early nineteenth century, the photogravure process allowed for photographs to be reproduced in books. In this process, light-sensitive gelatin was used to transfer the image to a metal plate, which would then be etched. Another process, chromolithography, which was developed in France in the mid-nineteenth century, permitted color printing. The process was extremely labor-intensive and expensive though as the artist would have to prepare a separate plate for each color used. In the late twentieth century, the process known as offset lithography made color printing cheaper and less-time consuming for the artist. The process used a chemical process to transfer a photographic negative to a rubber surface before printing.

There were various artistic movements and their proponents in the nineteenth and twentieth centuries that took an interest in the enrichment of book design and illustration. For example, Aubrey Beardsley, a proponent of both Art Nouveau and Aestheticism, had a great influence over book illustrations. Beardsley specialized in erotica and some of the best examples of his drawings were for the first English edition of Oscar Wilde's Salomé (1894).

Further reading
 Douglas Martin, The Telling Line Essays On Fifteen Contemporary Book Illustrators (1989)
 Edward Hodnett, Five Centuries of English Book Illustration (1988)
 Maurice Sendak, Caldecott & Co.: Notes on Books and Pictures (1988)
 Joyce Irene Whalley and Tessa Rose Chester, A History of Children's Book Illustration (1988)
 Elaine Moss, Part of the Pattern (1986) [incl. interviews with illustrators]
 John Lewis, The Twentieth Century Book: Its Illustration and Design (new ed. 1984)
 H. Carpenter and M. Prichard, The Oxford Companion to Children's Literature (1984)
 Brigid Peppin and Lucy Micklethwaite, Dictionary of British Book Illustrators: The Twentieth Century (1983)
 Alan Ross, Colours of War: War Art 1939-45 (1983)
 Hugh Williamson, Methods of Book Design (3rd. ed., 1983)
 Edward Hodnett, Image and Text: Studies in the Illustration of English Literature (1982)
 Hans Adolf Halbey, Im weiten Feld der Buchkunst (1982) [on 20th century]
 John Harthan, The History of the Illustrated Book: The Western Tradition (1981)
 Pat Gilmore, Artists at Curwen (1977. Tate Gallery)
 William Feaver, When We Were Young: Two Centuries of Children's Book Illustration (1977)
 Illustrators [periodical] (1975 onwards)
 Images [annual] (1975 onwards)
 Donnerae MacCann and Olga Richard, The Children's First Books: A Critical Study of Pictures and Text (1973)
 The Francis Williams Bequest: An Exhibition of Illustrated Books, 1967-71 [National Book League] (1972)
 Frank Eyre, British Children's Books in the Twentieth Century (1971)
 Walter Herdeg, An International Survey of Children's Book Illustration = special issue of Graphis; 155 (1971) [& subsequent surveys]
 Diana Klemin, The Illustrated Book: Its Art and Craft (1970)
 David Bland, A History of Book Illustration (2nd ed. 1969)
 W. J. Strachan, The Artist and the Book in France (1969)
 Bettina Hurlimann, Picture-Book World (1968)
 Bettina Hurlimann, Three Centuries of Children's Books in Europe (1967)
 Adrian Wilson, The Design of Books (1967)
 Rigby Graham, Romantic Book Illustration in England, 1943-55 (1965. Private Libraries Association)
 Bob Gill and John Lewis, Illustration: Aspects and Directions (1964)
 Robin Jacques, Illustrators at Work (1963. Studio Books)
 David Bland, The Illustration of Books (3rd. ed. 1962)
 Lynton Lamb, Drawing for Illustration (1962)
 Anders Hedvall and Bror Zachrisson, 'Children and their books', in Penrose Annual; 56 (1962), p. 59-66 & plates [incl. children's reactions]
 John Ryder, Artists of a Certain Line: A Selection of Illustrators for Children's Books (1960)
 Lynton Lamb, 'The True Illustrator', in Motif; 2 (1959 February), p. 70-76
 John Lewis, A Handbook of Type and Illustration (1956)
 John Lewis and John Brinkley, Graphic Design (1954)
 James Boswell, 'English book illustration today', in Graphis; 7/34 (1951), p. 42-57
 British Book Illustration 1935-45 [exhibition catalogue, National Book League] (1949)
 John Piper, 'Book illustration and the painter-artist', in Penrose Annual; 43 (1949), p. 52-54
 Lynton Lamb, 'Predicaments of illustration', in Signature; new series, 4 (1947), p. 16-27
 Bertha E. Mahoney, Illustrators of Children's Books 1744-1945 (1947) [and periodic supplements]

See also
 Illustration
 Extra-illustration
 Picture books
 Artist's book, works of art realized in the form of a book
 Bookbreaking
 Livre d'art, books in which the illustration holds a predominant place

Notes

References
Mayor, Hyatt A., Prints and People, Metropolitan Museum of Art/Princeton, 1971, 
S. Lazaris, Art et science vétérinaire à Byzance: Formes et fonctions de l’image hippiatrique, Turnhout, 2010,

External links 
 Old book illustrations (all public domain)

 Site for the scholarly study of the history of book illustration run by not-for-profit society (IBIS)

 Children's book illustration (private domain)

Illustration
Illustrated books
Book design